Giuffrida is an Italian surname. Notable people with the surname include:

Alfio Giuffrida (born 1953), Italian sculptor
Filippo Giuffrida Répaci  (born 1964) Italian journalist, director of the magazine La Lettre b
Giuseppe De Felice Giuffrida (1859–1920), Italian socialist politician and journalist
Louis O. Giuffrida (1920–2012), first director of the Federal Emergency Management Agency from 1981 to 1985
Odette Giuffrida (born 1994), Italian judoka

See also
Giuffrida metro station, located in Catania in Sicily, southern Italy

Italian-language surnames